Leribe Airport  is an airport serving Hlotse, the camptown (capital) of the Leribe District of Lesotho.

The runway is in a large, open field with many cross trails, but does have some side markers along its length.

See also

Transport in Lesotho
List of airports in Lesotho

References

External links
OpenStreetMap - Hlotse
Leribe Airport
OurAirports - Leribe

 Google Earth

Airports in Lesotho